Antiveduto Grammatica  (1571 – April 1626) was a proto-Baroque Italian painter, active near Rome.

Grammatica was born in either Siena or Rome.  According to Giovanni Baglione the artist was given the name Antiveduto ("foreseen") because his father had a premonition that he would soon be born during a journey between his native Siena and Rome. It was in Rome that Antiveduto was baptised, raised and based his career. His apprenticeship with the Perugian artist Giovanni Domenico Angelini (Giandomenico Perugino) introduced him to small-scale work, mostly on copper. He gained the nickname "gran Capocciante" because he specialised in painting heads of famous men. A decade later, in 1591, Antiveduto set up as an independent artist.

Grammatica's earliest surviving public commission, an old-fashioned configuration depicting Christ the Saviour with St. Stanislaus of Krakow, St. Adalbert of Prague and St Hyacinth Odrowaz, was painted for the high altar of Santo Stanislao dei Polacchi. Characterized by Giulio Mancini as most zealous in his profession, Antiveduto began his association with the Accademia di San Luca in 1593. He gained great familiarity with the two protectors of the Academy, Cardinals Federico Borromeo and Francesco Maria Del Monte, and was closely attached to the latter; so much that he was elected to the highest office of the association as "principe" in 1624. Shortly after this, however, he became embroiled in scandal. The machinations of Grammatica’s enemy Tommaso Salini over the attempt to sell off the Accademia's altarpiece, thought to be by Raphael, brought about a humiliating retreat, when Cardinal Del Monte intervened to re-establish the constitution of the institution.  His fortunes were in a way linked with the Cardinal himself, who was much frowned upon by the Barberini, and his death preceded that of Del Monte by four months, in April 1626.

His works are exhibited in numerous public collections, including the State Hermitage Museum - St Petersburg, the Museo Nacional del Prado – Madrid,
 the Kunsthistorisches Museum, Vienna, the Muzeul Naţional Brukenthal - Sibiu/Hermannstadt, Romania, the Kelvingrove Art Gallery and Museum – Glasgow,
 and the Maison D’Art Gallery, Monaco.

References

Further reading
Gianni Papi, Antiveduto Grammatica, Soncino 1995
Kathryn Bosi Monteath, “6. Antiveduto Gramatica: Saint Cecilia with two angels. Portrayed instruments”, "Marvels of sound and beauty" : Italian Baroque musical instruments, catalogue of the exhibition Florence, 12 June-4 November 207, Florence, Giunti, 2007, pp. 146–47
Helmut Philipp Riedl, Antiveduto della Grammatica (1570/1-1626) Lebun und Werk, Berlin 1998
Antonella Triponi, Antiveduto Grammatica. Una disputa del primo Seicento romano: nuovi documenti Storia dell'Arte 103
Gianni Papi,  Aggiornamenti per Antiveduto Gramatica, Arte Cristinana Marzo-Aprile 2003, 815 pp. 117–124
Massimo Pulini,  Il fossombrone ritrattista degli oratoriani. La racolta Mattei e Antiveduto Gramatica Paragone Marzo 2005 pp. 31–39
Giovanni Baglione, Le vite de' pittori scultori et architetti. Dal pontificato di Gregorio 13. del 1572. In fino a' tempi di papa Vrbano ottauo nel 1642, Roma, stamperia d'Andrea Fei, 1642, pp. 294–295, SBN IT\ICCU\NAPE\011153.
Alberto Macchi, L'uomo Caravaggio - atto unico / prefazione di Stefania Macioce, AETAS, Roma 1995,

External links

Orazio and Artemisia Gentileschi, a fully digitized exhibition catalog from The Metropolitan Museum of Art Libraries, which contains material on Antiveduto Grammatica (see index)

1571 births
1626 deaths
Italian Baroque painters
16th-century Italian painters
Italian male painters
17th-century Italian painters